Mount Hasan is a volcano in Anatolia, Turkey. It consists of various volcanic deposits, including several calderas, and its activity has been related to the presence of several faults in the area and to regional tectonics.

Activity began in the Miocene and continued into the Holocene; a mural found in the archeological site of Çatalhöyük have been controversially interpreted as showing a volcanic eruption or even a primitive map. It was the second mountain from the south in the Byzantine beacon system used to warn the Byzantine capital of Constantinople of incursions during the Arab–Byzantine wars.

Etymology 

The modern name of Mount Hasan is widely accepted to be in dedication to Ebu'l-Gazi (El-Hasan), brother of Ebu'l-Kasım during the reign of the Anatolian Seljuks.

It is hypothesized that Mount Hasan’s name was “Argeos” or “Argaios”, but this name belongs to Mount Erciyes. 
Another hypothesis is that it was simply called Árgos, (Ancient Greek: Ἄργος) as well as Argeiopolis Mons.

Mount Hasan was named Athar during the Hittites period.

Geography and geomorphology 

Mount Hasan lies in the Anatolian plateau, between the Taurus Range and the Pontic Mountains, and its and Mount Erciyes's silhouettes dominate the landscape and rise high above the surrounding terrain. In addition, there are seasonal settlements on the volcano which are associated with summer pastures.

Mount Hasan is part of a larger volcanic province in Central Anatolia known as the Central Anatolian or Cappadocian Volcanic Province., which includes ignimbrites, monogenetic volcanic fields and stratovolcanoes such as Mount Erciyes, Mount Hasan, Karacadağ and Melendiz Dağ with an area of about -. Volcanism took place during the Plio-Pleistocene and into the Quaternary.

Fossil rock glaciers are found on the volcano. The terrain of Mount Hasan is formed by phreatomagmatic breccias, ignimbrites, lahar deposits, lava domes, lava flows and pyroclastic flow deposits. The pyroclastic flow deposits occur in the form of fans or valley flows, when they were channelled by topography. The northern flanks also feature two debris avalanche deposits with hummocky surfaces. The volcanics of Mount Hasan have been subdivided into a "hot flow" unit, a "Mt. Hasan ashes" unit and into a lava unit.

Cinder cones, maars and accompanying lava flows also occur around Mount Hasan, they are part of a basaltic volcano family that forms parasitic vents. Many of the cones around Mount Hasan have been grouped as the Hasandağ-Karacadağ volcanic field.

Geology 

As a consequence of the subduction and eventual closure of the Neo-Tethys and continental collision between Arabia-Africa and Eurasia, Anatolia moves westward between the North Anatolian Fault and the East Anatolian Fault. This movement and the resulting tectonic deformation of Anatolia are responsible for volcanism in Central Anatolia which has been ongoing for the past 10 million years; this volcanism is defined as "post-collisional". Further, volcanism at Mount Hasan has been related to the Tuz Gölü Fault and its intersection with the Karaman-Aksaray faults; the former of these is one of two major fault systems in Central Anatolia which influence volcanism there, and volcanic products of Mount Hasan have been deformed by the fault. The Hasandag fault branches off the Karaman-Aksaray fault and cuts between the two summits of Mount Hasan.

Of these mountains,  is more heavily eroded compared to the steep cones of Hasan and like  is of early Pliocene age. This alignment is congruent with the tectonic patterns of Anatolia, where the collision between Africa and Eurasia follows the same trend. It and to some degree Mount Hasan are also surrounded by a large depression, and the volcanoes of this alignment are separated by faults.

The basement in Central Anatolia is formed by magmatic, metamorphic and ophiolitic rocks, the former of which are of Paleozoic to Mesozoic age; it crops out at scattered sites and in the Kirshehir and Nigde massifs. The surface however consists mainly of Tertiary volcanic rocks, which are formed both by volcaniclastic material and individual volcanoes. Central Anatolia has undergone uplift, for which several mechanisms have been proposed.

Composition 

Mount Hasan has produced volcanic rocks with compositions ranging from basalt to rhyolite but the dominant components are andesite and dacite which define an older tholeiitic and a younger calc-alkaline or alkaline suite. These rocks in turn include amphibole, apatite, biotite, clinopyroxene, garnet, ilmenite, mica, olivine, orthopyroxene, plagioclase, pyroxene in the form of augite, bronzite, diopside, hypersthene and salite, and quartz. The older volcanic stages have produced basaltic andesite while dacite appears only in the most recent stage. Obsidian also occurs in the most recent stage although it is not an important component while most of the rocks are porphyritic. The basaltic family includes both basaltic andesite and alkali basalts with augite, clinopyroxene, garnet, hornblende, hypersthene, olivine, orthopyroxene, oxides and plagioclase.

Magma mixing processes appear to be the most important mechanisms involved in the genesis of Mount Hasan magmas, which are derived from the mantle with participation of crustal components. Evidence of fractional crystallization has been encountered in the most recent stage rocks and more generally plays a role in the genesis of Hasan magmas although it does not explain all of the compositional traits. Older volcanic stages also show evidence of subduction influence while the more recent magmas are more indicative of intraplate processes, the effects of crustal extension and of the presence of water. In general, various sources have been proposed for the magmas of the Central Anatolian province.

Ecology and hydrology  
 
Oak forests occur on Mount Hasan. Between October/November and May, the mountain is frequently covered by snow due to the common precipitation at that time and when it melts the water mostly infiltrates into the permeable rocks, making the volcano a principal groundwater recharge area in the region. Additionally, volcanics of Mount Hasan form a major aquifer and the Melendiz River passes north and northeast of the volcano.

Eruption history 

Aside from the felsic central vent volcanism, basaltic volcanism also took place at Mount Hasan throughout its activity; this activity has been dated to 120,000, 65,000 and the most recent event 34,000 years ago. This volcanism however is not part of the actual Mount Hasan system.

 is the oldest (13 million years) volcanic structure, it is among the oldest volcanoes of the Central Anatolian volcanic province. This volcano is a small sized volcano with a caldera which crops out on the southwestern side of Mount Hasan. The Paleovolcano also formed a caldera which produced the rhyolitic Dikmen-Taspinar Ignimbrites; formerly the Cappadocian tuffs were in general attributed to volcanism at Mount Hasan, Mount Erciyes and Göllü Dag. 

The Quaternary activity gave rise to the Mesovolcano and Neovolcano, with the former centered between the two present-day summits. This volcano produced ignimbrites, lava domes and lava flows and eventually a caldera; it too has been dissected by faulting which probably also influenced the development of the volcano and its activity probably occurred between 1 and 0.15 million years ago. Finally, the Neovolcano grew within the caldera, producing various kinds of deposits; these include lava domes with accompanying pyroclastic flow deposits, breccia in the rim of the Mesovolcano caldera that probably formed through the interaction of intruding magma with water in the caldera, 700,000 years ago rhyolitic flows and ignimbrites accompanied by the formation of another,  caldera, and finally andesitic lava flows and lava domes which form the two main summits. Small Mount Hasan is probably older as it is more heavily eroded while the morphology of Big Hasan Dagi is fresher although its pyroclastic flow deposits are heavily incised. Dates of 33,000 and 29,000 years ago have been obtained on the summit domes and ages of 66,000±7,000 years on the most recent monogenetic volcano south of Mount Hasan. Tephras found in the Konya plain and in a lake of the Turkish Lakes Region have been attributed to Mount Hasan. The debris flow from Mount Hasan occurred 150,000-100,000 years ago and a number of lava flows were emplaced during the last 100,000 years.

Holocene and present activity 

Eruptions occurred 8,970 ± 640, 8,200, less than 6,000 years ago and 0 ± 3,000 years ago; the first emplaced pumice on the summit, the penultimate of these formed a lava dome on the northern flank while the last formed a lava flow on Mount Hasan's western foot. A shift in archeological sites around Mount Hasan may be linked to the older eruptions.

Hydrothermal activity also occurs at Mount Hasan, with fumaroles and water vapour emissions observed on the summit. Magnetotelluric imaging has found evidence of a magma chamber at  depth and of a possible hydrothermal system. A seismic swarm occurred southwest of Mount Hasan in 2020 next to a cinder cone that was active 2000 years ago, and reportedly there are frequent explosions within the volcano.

Possible portrayal of an eruption in a mural from Çatalhöyük

A mural discovered in Çatalhöyük has been interpreted as showing a volcanic eruption, commonly linked to Mount Hasan, and this mural has even been interpreted as being the oldest known map. The interpretation of the mural showing a volcanic eruption has been contested however as an alternative interpretation is that the "volcano" shown in the mural is actually a leopard and the "village" a set of random geometric motifs. The map interpretation is also contested.

If the mural indeed shows an eruption, it probably occurred only a short time before the mural was drawn. Radiocarbon dating has yielded ages of about 7,400 - 6,600 years BCE for Çatalhöyük and radiometric dating has produced evidence for explosive eruptions during the time that Çatalhöyük was inhabited. The recorded eruption probably was a lava dome eruption and a possible although disputed reconstruction of a mural recording the eruption is in Museum of Anatolian Civilizations in Ankara.
 The discovery of this mural has drawn attention to the volcano and has led to efforts to date the eruptive activity of Mount Hasan.

Importance during ancient history 
Mount Hasan was used as a source for Obsidian. The Byzantine city of Mokissos was located on Mount Hasan. The mountain is considered to be the second beacon of the Byzantine beacon system, which was used to relay information from the Taurus Mountains to the Byzantine capital Constantinople.

Gallery

See also
List of volcanoes in Turkey
List of Ultras of West Asia

References

Sources

External links 
 
  Niğde

Mountains of Turkey
Stratovolcanoes of Turkey
Landforms of Aksaray Province
Three-thousanders of Turkey
Calderas of Turkey
Pliocene stratovolcanoes
Pleistocene stratovolcanoes
Holocene stratovolcanoes